Stenusin is a piperidine alkaloid molecule synthesized by rove beetles of the genus Stenus Latreille. By lowering its abdomen and releasing stenusin, this genus of rove beetle are able to quickly escape predators through a process called skimming. Skimming is caused by the low surface tension of stenusin, which rapidly spreads over water surfaces when emitted and allows the beetle to glide away from danger.

Biosynthesis 
Stenusin is biosynthesized in the pygidial glands of Stenus Latreille, located in the last three segments of the beetles' abdomen. This molecule is the enzymatic product of several reactions that utilize L-lysine, L-isoleucine, and an acetate source. First, both L-lysine and L-isoleucine undergo separate decarboxylation reactions followed by oxidative deamination. The product created from L-lysine undergoes intramolecular Schiff base formation to create the piperidine ring found in stenusin. The two amino acid products then combine through a Stork enamine alkylation reaction and are further acylated and reduced to form stenusin.

References

Piperidine alkaloids